Energie can refer to:

 Energie clothing, Italian clothing brand
 Energie FC a Benin football club
 Energie Group, a UK based fitness franchise company
 Énergie, a French-language brand of rhythmic top 40 radio in Quebec, Canada
 FC Energie Cottbus, a German professional association-football (soccer) club

Note also the term Energiewende:

 Energiewende in Germany, the transition to a sustainable energy system for Germany